Stadion Lučko is a small stadium in the Lučko neighbourhood of Zagreb, Croatia which was built in 1973. It serves as home stadium for NK Lučko football club. The stadium has a capacity of 1,500 spectators.

Sports venues in Zagreb
Lučko
Buildings and structures in Zagreb County